William McDougall "Mac" Anderson (8 October 1919 – 21 December 1979) was a New Zealand cricketer who played in one Test match in 1946. His son Robert Anderson played international cricket for New Zealand in the 1970s.

Cricket career
Mac Anderson played for Canterbury from 1938–39 to 1949–50 as a batsman and occasional leg-spinner. He made his highest score in 1945–46, when he scored 137 in 396 minutes opening the batting for Canterbury against Otago. He made 61 for Canterbury against the Australians shortly afterwards, and was selected for the single Test against Australia in Wellington. He was one of six New Zealanders to make their Test debuts in this match; for five of them, including Anderson, it was their only Test. He made 4 and 1.

He made 285 runs at 71.25 in the 1948–49 Plunket Shield with three 50s, and played in the trial match, but was not selected for the subsequent tour to England.

See also
 One-Test wonder

References

External links
 

1919 births
1979 deaths
New Zealand Test cricketers
New Zealand cricketers
Canterbury cricketers
People from Westport, New Zealand
South Island cricketers
New Zealand Army cricketers
South Island Army cricketers